David Howell (born 20 May 1958) is a South African cricketer. He played in 80 first-class and 44 List A matches from 1976/77 to 1992/93.

References

External links
 

1958 births
Living people
South African cricketers
Border cricketers
Eastern Province cricketers
Gauteng cricketers
Western Province cricketers
Cricketers from Port Elizabeth